The 1900 London University by-election was a parliamentary by-election held for the House of Commons constituency of London University on 6–10 February 1900. It was won by the Liberal Unionist party candidate Sir Michael Foster.

Vacancy
The by-election was caused by the elevation to the peerage of the sitting Liberal Unionist Party MP Sir John Lubbock. Lubbock had held the seat since 1880, having previously been one of the MPs for the multi-member seat of Maidstone.

Candidates

Issues

Result

Sir Michael Foster won the election with a majority of 15 percent.

The election result was formally announced in the theatre of the university on 12 February 1900, following which Foster gave a short speech. He stated that the graduates of the university had for the first time returned a fellow graduate as their member, and told them he would be independent in his opinions even if he supported the present Unionist government.

References

1900 in London
1900 elections in the United Kingdom
History of the University of London
London University, 1900
London University, 1900
February 1900 events